Piré-sur-Seiche is a former commune in the Ille-et-Vilaine department of Brittany in northwestern France. On 1 January 2019, it was merged into the new commune Piré-Chancé.

Population
People from Piré-sur-Seiche are called Piréens in French.

Personalities
 Léon Letort, pioneer French aviator

See also
Communes of the Ille-et-Vilaine department

References

Former communes of Ille-et-Vilaine